Alan Norman Hoole (25 April 1942 – 8 May 2000) was the Governor of Saint Helena, Ascension and Tristan da Cunha between 1991 and 1995, he then served as Governor of Anguilla between 1995 and 1996.

He was educated at Sheffield University and College of Law, London, and had previously worked as a solicitor.

Hoole died in May 2000, at the age of 58.

References

1942 births
2000 deaths
British colonial governors and administrators in Africa
British colonial governors and administrators in the Americas
Governors of Anguilla
Governors of Saint Helena